; (March 31, 1925 – January 27, 2023) was a Japanese historical fiction writer.

Biography

She also studied economy history at the University of Tokyo from 1947 to 1948. After her marriage to the Nobuo Kuroita, the son of historian Kuroita Katsumi, she went to work as an editor for the publishing company Shogakukan, but began to write her own stories with historical settings on the side.

In 1952, she submitted her debut work, Sanjoin ki ("History of Lady Sanjo") to the Sunday Mainichi, where it was awarded second place in the 30th anniversary commemorative edition of that publication. This encouraged her to pursue a career in literature full-time, winning the prestigious Naoki Award in 1964, the 21st Women's Culture Award in 1982, the 32nd Kikuchi Kan Prize in 1984, and the Yoshikawa Eiji Literary Award.

Nagai was noted for historical novels reassessing the role of women in Japanese history, deviating from the traditional narrative. She has been praised for combining historical accuracy with translating her characters emotions into modern terms. In Hōjō Masako, she countered popular image of Minamoto no Yoritomo's jealous, power-grasping wife Hōjō Masako (1157–1225) with a more human, sympathetic personality. Her novel was the basis for a yearlong television drama on the Japanese government television network NHK, in 1979.

Likewise, in Gin no yakata ("Silver Mansion", 1980) she rehabilitated the image of Hino Tomiko (1440–1496), wife of the ineffectual shōgun Ashikaga Yoshimasa. Historically scorned as an "evil money-grubbing woman" who dragged the country into war, Nagai's portrayal is of a woman who is savior of the government, and who is skilled at finance and politics.
However, her writing was not entirely on the role of women. In 1997, NHK aired a year-long historical drama in 50 episodes, Mōri Motonari, on the life of the Sengoku-period daimyō, based on Nagai's book of the same name.

Nagai died on January 27, 2023, at the age of 97.

Selected works
  (1964)
  (1965)
  (1966)
  (1967)
  (1967
  (1969)
  (1969)
  (1971)
  (1971)
  (1971)
  (1972)
  (1972)
  (1972)
  (1972)
  (1972)
  (1972)
  (1972)
  (1972)

See also
 
 Japanese literature
 List of Japanese authors

References

Bibliography 

 

1925 births
2023 deaths
20th-century Japanese novelists
20th-century Japanese women writers
21st-century Japanese novelists
21st-century Japanese women writers
Japanese screenwriters
Japanese women novelists
Tokyo Woman's Christian University alumni
Naoki Prize winners
Writers from Tokyo